The 1951–52 La Salle Explorers men's basketball team represented La Salle University. The Explorers would win the 1952 National Invitation Tournament.

National Invitation Tournament
First Round 
La Salle 80, Seton Hall 76
Quarterfinals 
La Salle 51, St. John's 45
Semifinal round 
La Salle 59, Duquesne 46
Final 
La Salle 75, Dayton 64

Awards and honors
Tom Gola and Norm Grekin, NIT co-Most Valuable Players

Team players drafted into the NBA

Rankings

References

La Salle Explorers men's basketball seasons
La Salle Explorers
La Salle
National Invitation Tournament championship seasons
La Salle
La Salle